Asteriscium is a genus of flowering plant in the family Apiaceae, with about 8 species. It is endemic to temperate South America.

References

Apiaceae genera
Azorelloideae